P. A. Ariyaratne was the 42nd Surveyor General of Sri Lanka. He was appointed in 2003, succeeding K. L. A. Ranasinghe Silva, and held the office until 2004. He was succeeded by B. J. P. Mendis.

References

A